The ARIA Streaming Track chart ranks the highest streamed music tracks within Australia and is provided by the Australian Recording Industry Association.

History
The Streaming Track Chart was established in 2012 and first published on 10 December. The chart still runs weekly  but Subscription is required for this chart.

Trivia

Songs with the most weeks at number one
23 Weeks
Tones and I - "Dance Monkey" (2019-2020)
14 Weeks
Ed Sheeran - "Shape of You" (2017)
13 Weeks
Drake - "One Dance" (2016)
12 Weeks
Luis Fonsi and Daddy Yankee featuring Justin Bieber - "Despacito" (2017)
11 Weeks
Drake - "God's Plan" (2018)
10 Weeks
Avicii - "Wake Me Up" (2013)
The Chainsmokers - "Closer" (2016)
Pharrell Williams - "Happy" (2014)

Cumulative weeks at number one

Justin Bieber (37)
Drake (32)
Ed Sheeran (26)
Pharrell Williams (23)
Tones and I (23)
Post Malone (18)
Macklemore (16)

Artists with the most number ones

This list includes main artists and featured artists.

Justin Bieber (7)
Post Malone (6)
Drake (4)
Macklemore (4)
Ed Sheeran (3)

See also

ARIA Digital Track Chart

References

Australian record charts